Sawzall may refer to:

 Sawzall (tool), a brand of reciprocating saw manufactured by Milwaukee Electric Tool
 Sawzall (programming language), a domain-specific programming language
 "Sawzall" (song), by the American singer and songwriter Banks